Richard Dale Amman (born September 21, 1950) is a former American football defensive tackle in the National Football League (NFL) for the Baltimore Colts. He also was a member of the Florida Blazers and San Antonio Wings in the World Football League. He played college football at Florida State University.

Early years
Amman moved to Florida when he was 11 years old. He attended Cocoa Beach High School, where he was an All-county defensive tackle. He moved on to Northeast Oklahoma Junior College.

After his freshman season he transferred to Florida State University, where he began his career at center, before being switched to defensive tackle as a sophomore. As a junior, he was named a starter at defensive tackle, making 37 tackles and 2 fumble recoveries. As a senior, he registered 81 tackles (37 solo).

Professional career

Dallas Cowboys
Amman was selected by the Dallas Cowboys in the tenth round (260th overall) of the 1972 NFL Draft. He was waived on August 29.

Baltimore Colts
On August 30, 1972, he was claimed off waivers by the Baltimore Colts. He was a backup defensive end that played mainly on special teams. He had 16 tackles on defense.

In 1973, he started two games at defensive end. He posted 10 tackles and recovered one fumble. He was released on September 8, 1974.

Florida Blazers (WFL)
In 1974, he was signed by the Florida Blazers of the World Football League. In 1975, the team relocated to San Antonio and were rechristened as the San Antonio Wings, where he played until the league folded on October 22.

Personal life
After football, he worked for the Lake school district for 24 years. His son Eustis played football at Florida State University and was a part of the 2001 preseason roster for the San Diego Chargers and Jacksonville Jaguars.

References

External links
Just Sports Stats

1950 births
Living people
People from Cocoa Beach, Florida
Players of American football from Florida
American football defensive tackles
Northeastern Oklahoma A&M Golden Norsemen football players
Florida State Seminoles football players
Baltimore Colts players
Florida Blazers players
San Antonio Wings players